Elevate is the debut studio album by American progressive house DJ Morgan Page, released on March 25, 2008 through Nettwerk. The album is a compilation of original songs and remixes that Morgan Page has done for other artists; it contains a total of four original tracks and eight remixes. It also includes the Grammy-nominated deadmau5 remix for his song "The Longest Road", featuring Lissie, as a bonus track. The remix was nominated in 2008 for Best Remixed Recording, Non-Classical.

Track listing
All songs are written and produced by Morgan Page. Remixes with the original artists are noted.

References

External links
 Elevate - Morgan Page | AllMusic

2008 debut albums
Morgan Page albums